"It's Too Late" is a song written and sung by Bobby Goldsboro, which he recorded on October 15, 1965, and released on January 7, 1966. Ray Stevens contributes the harmony vocals in the chorus.  The song spent 8 weeks on the Billboard Hot 100 chart, peaking at No. 23, while reaching No. 5 on Canada's RPM 100.

Chart performance

Cover versions
 Shaun Cassidy covered "It's Too Late" on his 1977 debut LP, Shaun Cassidy.
Johnny Rivers covered the song on his album Whisky A Go-Go Revisited (1967).
 John Paul Young covered the song on the album, The Singer (1981).

References 

1965 songs
1966 singles
Bobby Goldsboro songs
United Artists Records singles
Songs written by Bobby Goldsboro